Thonthan Satjadet (born 1 November 1993) is a Thai judoka. She won the gold medal in the women's +78 kg event at the 2019 Southeast Asian Games held in the Philippines.

She also won one of the bronze medals in the women's +78 kg event at the 2014 Asian Games held in Incheon, South Korea. She also competed in the women's team event.

References

External links 
 

Living people
1993 births
Place of birth missing (living people)
Thonthan Satjadet
Judoka at the 2014 Asian Games
Medalists at the 2014 Asian Games
Asian Games medalists in judo
Thonthan Satjadet
Southeast Asian Games medalists in judo
Thonthan Satjadet
Competitors at the 2019 Southeast Asian Games
Thonthan Satjadet